The French Basketball Cup, or French Basketball Federation Cup, is the annual national basketball federation cup competition of France. It is organized by the French Basketball Federation. It is also known as the Trophée Robert Busnel (Robert Busnel Trophy), named after the late basketball player Robert Busnel, who died in 1991.

A total of 54 amateur and professional teams from France, participate in the cup competition.

History 
 1952–53 to 1968–69 French Cup (including professional clubs)*
 1981–82 to 1984–85 Federation Cup
 1992–93 to 1994–95 League Cup
 1995–96 to present French Cup (including professional clubs)
*From 1971 to 1995, the French Cup was not contested by professional clubs.

Title holders 

 1952–53 ASVEL
 1953–54 PUC
 1954–55 PUC
 1955–56 Auboué
 1956–57 ASVEL
 1957–58 Étoile Charleville-Mézières
 1958–59 Étoile Charleville-Mézières
 1959–60 Denain Voltaire
 1960–61 Stade Auto Lyon
 1961–62 PUC
 1962–63 PUC
 1963–64 Moderne
 1964–65 ASVEL
 1965–66 Nantes
 1966–67 ASVEL
 1967–68 Not held
 1968–69 JA Vichy
 1969–70 JA Vichy
 1970–81 Not held
 1981–82 Limoges CSP
 1982–83 Limoges CSP
 1983–84 ASVEL
 1984–85 Limoges CSP
 1985–92 Not held
 1992–93 JDA Dijon
 1993–94 Limoges CSP
 1994–95 Limoges CSP
 1995–96 ASVEL
 1996–97 ASVEL
 1997–98 Cholet
 1998–99 Cholet
 1999–00 Limoges CSP
 2000–01 ASVEL
 2001–02 Pau-Orthez
 2002–03 Pau-Orthez
 2003–04 Le Mans Sarthe
 2004–05 BCM Gravelines
 2005–06 JDA Dijon
 2006–07 Pau-Orthez
 2007–08 ASVEL
 2008–09 Le Mans Sarthe
 2009–10 Orléans
 2010–11 Élan Chalon
 2011–12 Élan Chalon
 2012–13 Paris-Levallois
 2013–14 JSF Nanterre
 2014–15 SIG
 2015–16 Le Mans Sarthe
 2016–17 Nanterre 92
 2017–18 SIG
 2018–19 ASVEL
 2019–20 Not held
 2020–21 ASVEL
 2021-22 Pau-Orthez

Finals

French Cup (1982–1995)

Most Valuable Player

See also
 French Pro A League
 French Leaders Cup (French League Cup)
 Match des Champions (French Supercup)

References

External links
Official website 

 
Basketball cup competitions in France